Poltavka is the name of several inhabited localities in Russia.

Urban localities
Poltavka, Poltavsky District, Omsk Oblast, a work settlement in Poltavsky District of Omsk Oblast

Rural localities
Poltavka, Novosibirsk Oblast, a selo in Chanovsky District of Novosibirsk Oblast
Poltavka, Nizhneomsky District, Omsk Oblast, a village in Solovetsky Rural Okrug of Nizhneomsky District in Omsk Oblast
Poltavka, Primorsky Krai, a selo in Oktyabrsky District of Primorsky Krai
Poltavka, Ryazan Oblast, a village in Inyakinsky Rural Okrug of Shilovsky District in Ryazan Oblast
Poltavka, Saratov Oblast, a selo in Samoylovsky District of Saratov Oblast
Poltavka, Voronezh Oblast, a selo in Dyachenkovskoye Rural Settlement of Bogucharsky District in Voronezh Oblast